Denis Butler may refer to:
 Denis J. Butler, member of the New York State Assembly
 Denis Anthony Brian Butler, 9th Earl of Lanesborough, Anglo-Irish aristocrat

See also
 Dennis Butler (born 1944), English football player and manager
 Dennis E. Butler (born 1940), American politician from Iowa